Edward Wilson-Lee is an English literature academic at Sidney Sussex College, University of Cambridge, and a specialist in the literature and the history of the book in the early modern period.

Early life
Wilson-Lee is the son of wildlife conservationists, and was born in the same Midwest farming town as his father. He studied English at University College London, and completed a doctorate at Oxford and Cambridge.

Selected publications
 A History of Water : Being an Account of a Murder, an Epic and Two Visions of Global History, William Collins, 2022.
 The Catalogue of Shipwrecked Books: Young Columbus and the Quest for a Universal Library.  William Collins, 2018.
 Shakespeare in Swahililand. William Collins, 2016.
 Translation and the Book Trade in Early Modern Europe. Cambridge University Press, 2014. (Edited with José María Pérez Fernández)

Awards and honors
Shakespeare in Swahililand: Adventures with the Ever-living Poet became a finalist of William Saroyan International Prize for Writing for non-fiction in 2018.

The Catalogue of Shipwrecked Books: Young Columbus and the Quest for a Universal Library was shortlisted for the James Tait Black Prize in Biography and awarded the PEN Hessell-Tiltman Prize in 2019.

Wilson-Lee was named a Guggenheim Fellow in the category of General Nonfiction in 2022.

Personal life
He is married, with two sons, and lives in the Cambridge area.

See also
 Libro de los Epítomes

References

External links 
HOME PAGE

Fellows of Sidney Sussex College, Cambridge
Living people
British academics of English literature
Alumni of University College London
Alumni of the University of Cambridge
Year of birth missing (living people)